Galton is an unincorporated community in Douglas County, Illinois, United States.

The community was named after Douglas Galton, a British actuary who visited Illinois several times to examine the books of the Illinois Central Railroad on behalf of Dutch and British investors. In 1883, a post office was established.

References

Unincorporated communities in Douglas County, Illinois
Unincorporated communities in Illinois